Valves are quite diverse and may be classified into a number of types.

Basic types - by operating principle

Valves can be categorized into the following types, based on their operating mechanism:
Ball valve, for on–off control without pressure drop. Ideal for quick shut-off, since a 90° turn completely shuts-off, compared to multiple 360° turns for other manual valves
Butterfly valve, for on–off flow control in large diameter pipes
Choke valve, a solid cylinder placed around or inside a second cylinder with multiple holes or slots, inside a housing. Shifting the solid cylinder exposes more or fewer holes. Used in oil and gas wellheads, where the pressure drop is high. (Not to be confused with engine choke valve, below.)
Diaphragm valve or membrane valve, controls flow by movement of a diaphragm. Used in pharmaceutical applications
Gate valve, mainly for on–off control, with low pressure drop
Globe valve, good for regulating flow. Uses a cylinder movement over a seat
Knife valve, similar to a gate valve, but usually more compact. Often used for slurries or powders on–off control
Needle valve for accurate flow control
Pinch valve, for slurry flow regulation and control
Piston valve, for regulating fluids that carry solids in suspension
Piston valve (steam engine)
Plug valve, slim valve for on–off control but with some pressure drop
Solenoid valve, an electrically actuated valve for hydraulic or pneumatic fluid control
Spool valve, for hydraulic control; similar to the choke valve

Basic types - by function
Valves can be categorized also based on their function:
Check valve or non-return valve, allows the fluid to pass in one direction only
Flow control valve, to maintain and control a variable flow rate through the valve
Poppet valve, commonly used in piston engines to regulate the fuel mixture intake and exhaust
Pressure-balanced valve
Pressure reducing valve, regulates the pressure of a fluid
Safety valve or relief valve: operates automatically at a set pressure to correct a potentially dangerous situation, typically over-pressure
Sampling valve

Specific types
These are more specific types of valves, used only in particular fields or applications.
Often they are subcategories of the classification by operating principle and by function:
Aspin valve: a cone-shaped metal part fitted to the cylinder head of an engine
Ballcock: often used as a water level controller (cistern)
Bibcock: provides a connection to a flexible hosepipe
Blast valve: prevents rapid overpressuring in a fallout shelter or a bunker
Boston valve: three-part two-port check valve used on inflatable boats, air mattresses, airbeds etc.; available in two sizes, normal and small
Ceramic valve, used mainly in high duty cycle applications or on abrasive fluids. Ceramic disc can also provide Class IV seat leakage
Cock: colloquial term for a small valve or a stopcock
Choke valve, Butterfly valve used to limit air intake in internal combustion engine. (Not to be confused with choke valves used in industrial flow control, above.)
Clapper valve: a type of check valve used in the Siamese fire appliance to allow only one hose to be connected instead of two (the clapper valve blocks the other side from leaking out)
Demand valve, part of a diving regulator
Double beat valve
Double check valve
Duckbill valve
Fill and drain valve: a valve used in space and missile industry which achieves extremely tight leakage, while providing redundant inhibits against external leakage
Flapper valve
Flow divider valve: a valve providing a plurality of output flows from a single fluid source
Flutter (Heimlich) valve: a specific one-way valve used on the end of chest drain tubes to treat a pneumothorax
Foot valve: a check valve on the foot of a suction line to prevent backflow
Four-way valve: was used to control the flow of steam to the cylinder of early double-acting steam engines
Freeze seal or Freeze plug: in which freezing and melting the fluid creates and removes a plug of frozen material acting as the valve
Gas pressure regulator regulates the flow and pressure of a gas
Heart valve: regulates blood flow through the heart in many organisms
Hydrodynamic vortex valve: a passive flow control valve that uses hydrodynamic forces to regulate flow
Larner–Johnson Valve: needle control valve often in large sizes used in water supply systems
Leaf valve: one-way valve consisting of a diagonal obstruction with an opening covered by a hinged flap
Line blind valve: a thin sheet oriented perpendicular to the pipe. The sheet has a solid end and a flow-through end; sliding it from one position to the other opens or stops the flow. Also called sliding blind valve
Outflow valve: regulates flow and pressure, part of cabin pressurization
Pilot valve: regulates flow or pressure to other valves
Petcock, a small shut-off valve
Pinch valve, "beach ball valve": simple, single-part two-port check valve made from soft plastic and molded onto inflatable units such as beach balls, air mattresses, water wings; can be inflated by pump or by mouth
Plunger valve: To regulate flow while lowering the pressure
Poppet valve and sleeve valve: commonly used in piston engines to regulate the fuel mixture intake and exhaust
Pressure regulator or pressure reducing valve (PRV): reduces pressure to a preset level downstream of the valve
Pressure sustaining valve, or back-pressure regulator: maintains pressure at a preset level upstream of the valve
Presta valve, Schrader valve, or Dunlop valve, holds the air inside bicycle tires
Reed valve: consists of two or more flexible materials pressed together along much of their length, but with the influx area open to allow one-way flow, much like a heart valve
Regulator: used in SCUBA diving equipment and in gas cooking equipment to reduce the high pressure gas supply to a lower working pressure
Rocker valve
Rotary valves and piston valves: parts of brass instruments used to change their pitch
Rotolock valve
Rupture disc: a one-time-use replaceable valve for rapid pressure relief, used to protect piping systems from excessive pressure or vacuum; more reliable than a safety valve
Saddle valve: where allowed, is used to tap a pipe for a low-flow need
Schrader valve: holds the air inside automobile tires
Security valve, a type of automatic shut-off valve (ASV): used to stop the flow of natural gas upon sudden pressure changes. Increased pressure or decreased pressure closes the valve (without using any external power sources). Installing a bypass pipe with a pushbutton to open valve (normally spring closed valve) between the inlet and outlet of the security valve can let the upstream and downstream pressure can be equalized on both sides of the security valve, so it can be reset. Security valves are used at schools, hospitals, prisons, and other hard-to-evacuate buildings.
Slide gate valve: Ideal for handling dry bulk material in gravity flow, dilute phase, or dense phase pneumatic conveying applications. Similar to a sliding line blind valve, but the latter is for higher-pressure applications
Slide valve: used in early steam engines to control admission and emission of steam from the piston
Stopcock: restricts or isolates flow through a pipe
Swirl valve: a specially designed Joule-Thompson pressure reduction/expansion valve imparting a centrifugal force upon the discharge stream for improving gas–liquid phase separation
Tap (British English), faucet (American English): the common name for a valve used in homes to regulate water flow
Tesla valve: a form of check valve with no moving parts, invented by Nikola Tesla for use with fluids
Thermally operated valves:
Thermal expansion valve, used in refrigeration and air conditioning systems
Thermostatic mixing valve
Thermostatic radiator valve
Thermal shut off valve or Thermally released shut off valve, protects against excessive temperature, mandatory in the gas installation of some countries
Trap primer: sometimes include other types of valves, or are valves themselves
Vacuum breaker valve: prevents the back-siphonage of contaminated water into pressurized drinkable water supplies

References

 
Engineering-related lists